Eve Kivi (real name Eeve Kivi; born on 8 May 1938 in Paide) is an Estonian actress.

Biography
In 1959 she graduated from Estonian Drama Theatre's learning studio. She has worked at Tallinnfilm and Mosfilm. Since 1955 she has played on about 50 films.

From 1965 until 1972, she was married to speed skater Ants Antson.

Awards:
 1983: Estonian SSR merited artist

Selected filmography

 1959 "Vallatud kurvid" (role: ?)
 1961 "Ohtlikud kurvid" (role: ?)
 1969 "Viimne reliikvia" (role: ?)
 1974 "Ohtlikud mängud" (role: ?)
 1975 "Briljandid proletariaadi diktatuurile" (role: ?)
 1992 "Need vanad armastuskirjad" (role: ?)
 1994 "Tulivesi" (role: Lulu)

See also
 Dean Reed

References

Living people
1938 births
Estonian film actresses
People from Paide